The Millionaire Policeman is a 1926 American silent drama film directed by Edward LeSaint and starring Herbert Rawlinson, Eva Novak and Eugenie Besserer.

The son of a millionaire is ashamed when he fails to come to the assistance of a female friend after a riding accident, and she is instead rescued by a policeman. He leaves town and joins the police force, eventually earning a medal for heroism.

Cast
 Herbert Rawlinson as Steven Wallace
 Eva Novak as Mary Gray
 Eugenie Besserer as Mrs. Gray
 Arthur Rankin as Jimmy Gray
 Lillian Langdon as Mrs. Wallace

References

Bibliography
 Munden, Kenneth White. The American Film Institute Catalog of Motion Pictures Produced in the United States, Part 1. University of California Press, 1997.

External links

1926 films
1926 drama films
American black-and-white films
Silent American drama films
American silent feature films
1920s English-language films
Films directed by Edward LeSaint
1920s American films